Pigeon Roost Creek is a stream in Monroe County in the U.S. state of Missouri.

Pigeon Roost Creek was so named on account of the passenger pigeons which once were numerous in the area.

See also
List of rivers of Missouri

References

Rivers of Monroe County, Missouri
Rivers of Missouri